Australian Motor Industries (AMI) was an automobile assembly firm that was significant in the early history of the automotive industry in Australia.

Start of production 

The origins of Australian Motor Industries can be traced back to 1926 when J.F. Crosby decided to invest in Eclipse Motors Pty Ltd of Melbourne. In 1929 the company secured the Victorian agency for Standard Motor Company's cars, then changed the company name to Talbot and Standard Motors, and began a steady period of expansion with the Standard marque through the 1930s. In 1952 the Crosby family formed a holding company, Standard Motor Products Ltd, in co-operation with the Standard Motor Company of England to assemble cars at a new assembly plant in Port Melbourne. The subsidiary company responsible for vehicle assembly was the Standard Motor Company (Australia) Limited. It assembled the Standard Eight, Vanguard, Spacemaster and the Triumph Mayflower. 

Import tariffs on vehicles encouraged the growth of the Australian vehicle body building industry from the early 1920s. The tax concessions varied with the degree of local content.

Changes within the industry saw the consolidation of the principal manufacturers and the demise of the smaller body builders. The Port Melbourne assembly plant was one of many new facilities which were set up to meet the post war demand for new vehicles.

Standard Motor Products Ltd was unusual in the Australian motor industry because of the high Australian shareholding of the company; 88% in 1952 when the Australian company bought out its English partner. The remaining shares were held by the Standard Motor Company (SMC). As a sign of the close co-operation between the two companies, SMC's Sir John Black was made president and Arthur Crosby remained as chairman. His brother, Clive Crosby, became the managing director. By 1956, the factory employed over 1,600 workers. 

When Leyland Motors, the new owners of Standard, indicated it wished to assume its own production of Triumph cars in Australia, AMI needed to find another car to assemble. The answer came with Mercedes-Benz. In 1958 the company negotiated an agreement with Daimler-Benz to assemble and distribute Mercedes-Benz vehicles in Australia. In recognition of this new agreement the company was renamed Australian Motor Industries and a new subsidiary company was formed to handle the Mercedes-Benz franchise. Passenger vehicle sales show 729 locally assembled Mercedes-Benz cars were sold between July 1959 and June 1960. By 1960 Mercedes-Benz had increased passenger car sales in Australia by 10 fold annually, selling as many cars per year as had been sold in the first fifty years.

Leyland decided not to proceed with its own Australian operation, allowing AMI to begin production of the Triumph Herald from 1959. AMI also assembled Ferguson tractors through another subsidiary company of the group, British Farm Equipment. An extensive dealer network throughout New South Wales and Victoria saw Standard cars and Ferguson tractors sold side by side in country areas. The most popular car sold was the Vanguard model.

Reorganisation 

In October 1960, AMI signed an agreement with American Motors Corporation (AMC) to assemble the Rambler range of cars from knock-down kits. Another deal with Fiat was planned to replace the Ferguson tractors distributed by BFE. The Standard Motor Company had sold its tractor facility in Coventry to Massey Ferguson and focused on automobile production.

AMI ran into financial trouble during the Australian credit squeeze of 1961 and the company was forced to sell off many assets and vehicle stock to remain solvent. Part of the restructure resulted in the sale of their share in the Mercedes-Benz franchise to the German parent company.

In 1963 the company secured the Australian franchise for Toyota cars and began assembly of the Tiara range. From this point the financial position of the company steadily improved and by 1967 AMI was assembling 32 different models for the Australian market, as well as importing fully assembled Toyota Corollas for their dealer network.

Other cars assembled by AMI included the Rambler range from American Motors Corporation and Triumph cars from Leyland Motors. Leyland had inherited shares in AMI when it had merged with Standard-Triumph International in 1961.

During the early 1960s the foreign share of the automobile motor vehicle market was estimated to be 95%, and as the only sizeable producer with a local equity, AMI continued to manufacture overseas designs.

AMI assembled the Triumph Herald from 1959 to 1966 and produced some unique Australian models. Production of the Standard Vanguard Six at the AMI plant finally came to a halt some 12 months after production had ended in Britain, however the engine remained in production for fitment to the Triumph 2000. The Triumph 2000/2500 range was assembled in Port Melbourne from 1964 to the mid-1970s.

By 1965, the demise of the Standard Vanguard and the loss of assembly rights for Mercedes-Benz vehicles left AMI with additional capacity to assemble Rambler, Triumph and Toyota models.

Operations with AMC 

From 1961, AMI assembled a range of AMC cars, starting with the Rambler Ambassador, all with right-hand drive and carried the Rambler brand name. By the end of the 1960s Australians could purchase a Rambler Javelin, AMX, Hornet, Rebel, or Matador long after the Rambler marque was dropped from use on the equivalent U.S.-market models.

Knock-down kits were shipped from AMC's Kenosha, Wisconsin facility (all knock-down kits to all assembly operations were from Kenosha), but the Australian cars were assembled with a percentage of "local content" to gain tariff concessions. This was done using parts and components (such as glass, seats, upholstery and carpet, lights, tailshafts, and heaters) from local Australian suppliers. AMI specified what parts were not to be included in the unassembled kits sent by AMC. Other necessary parts specified by the assembler were boxed and shipped for assembly at the final destination in Australia. It is unknown exactly how many parts were included to be installed by the assembly operation, that varied with each operation. External colours were chosen by AMI and were the same as used on AMI assembled Triumph and Toyota cars of that period. The distinctive AMI exterior emblems were used on Ramblers, as well as Triumph and Toyota cars assembled by AMI from 1968 onward.

The Australian assembled Rebel was assembled from 1967 until 1971, even though the last year of the American model was 1970. 345 Rebels were assembled in 1970 and a further 307 in 1971. Australian Rebels were equipped with the dash and instrument cluster of the 1967 Rambler Ambassador for all models and was continued with the Australian assembled replacement AMC Matador.

A total of 24 AMC AMXs, all 1969 models were made by AMI between August 1969 and July 1970. All featured the  V8s. Differences to the RHD two-seater AMXs compared to the U.S. models included swapping the power brake booster and heater motor on the firewall, the power steering pump remained in its usual left location, although the rest of the steering components had to be on the right side of the cars. All of the Australian AMX interiors were finished in black featuring a unique RHD dashboard with a wood-grained instrument cluster in front of the driver. While the AMX was marketed as a performance muscle car in the U.S. marketplace, the Australian AMXs came with a large high level of equipment that was optional in the U.S., and these AMXs were advertised as personal luxury cars.

One AMC Gremlin was imported from USA in 1970 for evaluation purposes. It was locally converted to right-hand-drive and branded as a "Rambler Gremlin". The car features the standard  I6 engine with three-speed manual transmission. The car was presented at the 1970 Sydney Motor Show to gauge interest and test the market but never went into production.

From 1971, Australian assembled Matadors were equipped with standard column shift automatic transmissions, power steering, power windows, air conditioning, and an AM radio. The engine in the later years was AMC's  V8. Options included exterior sunvisor, vinyl roof cover, tow hitch, and mud flaps. 

A total of 118 Hornets and 145 Matadors (118 sedans, 27 wagons) were sold during 1974. Registrations for 1975 were 136 Hornets and 118 Matadors (85 sedans 33 wagons). 1975 was the last year of Hornet production leaving the Matador as the only AMC product thereafter. In 1976 there were 88 Matadors (78 sedans, 10 wagons) registered. 1976 saw the one-off assembly of 80 Matador Coupes, the knock down kits of which had arrived in late 1974 but were not built. The Matador Coupes were sold as 1977 models bringing 1977 registrations to 80 Matador Coupes, 24 Matador sedans and 3 wagons. December 1976 marked the end of local assembly of AMC vehicles. 

One fully assembled AMC Pacer was imported for evaluation purposes. As with the Gremlin, AMI did not go ahead with assembling the Pacer for the Australian market. 

While Toyotas and Triumphs were the main focus of AMI, the company retained a niche market as the sole U.S. sourced cars available in the Australian marketplace. For example, the Government of New South Wales selected the Rambler Rebel and the Matador as official vehicles in the 1970s.

Toyota and buyout 

The first Toyota car ever built outside Japan was assembled by AMI in April 1963, the Toyota Tiara. The AMI production of Toyotas expanded in the 1960s to also include the Crown, Corona and Corolla assembled at AMI's Port Melbourne factory. Toyota Motor Corporation of Japan purchased 10% of outstanding AMI shares. As a fast-growing company, it took a controlling interest in AMI in 1968 as a contract with the British Leyland Motor Corporation Ltd was signed. Toyota also purchased a 40% share in Thiess Toyota, the importer of Toyota light commercial vehicles from Thiess. In 1971 British Leyland absorbed British Motor Corporation thereby acquiring Standard Triumph. Toyota purchased 40% more stock thereby increasing their AMI holdings to 50%.   

Recognizing the majority owner of the company and the products that it manufactured and marketed, AMI renamed itself as AMI Toyota Ltd in 1985. The company continued to be listed on the Australian Securities Exchange with a minority Australian shareholding until 1987, when Toyota moved to acquire the shares held by the remaining shareholders.

The Japanese company then amalgamated the company with its other Australian operations in 1989 to form two arms. Toyota Motor Corporation Australia which was responsible for passenger vehicles and Toyota Motor Sales Australia which was responsible for both Toyota commercial vehicles and Hino trucks.

Toyota vehicle production was transferred from the historic Port Melbourne factory to the company's new $420 million facility at Altona, Victoria in 1994. The Australian facility did export CKD kits to assembly plants in Thailand, Malaysia, Indonesia, Vietnam, and the Philippines, until the end of Toyota production of all cars in Australia in 2017.

Notes

Further reading

External links 

http://www.hudson-amc.org.au/ The Hudson – AMC Car Club of Australia]

American Motors
Car manufacturers of Australia
Companies formerly listed on the Australian Securities Exchange
Defunct manufacturing companies of Australia
Leyland Motors
Toyota
Luxury motor vehicle manufacturers
Vehicle manufacturing companies established in 1926
Vehicle manufacturing companies disestablished in 1987
Australian companies established in 1926
Australian companies disestablished in 1987